Leptospermum thompsonii, commonly known as the monga tea-tree, is a species of tall shrub that is endemic to south eastern New South Wales. It has rough, flaky bark, broadly elliptical to egg-shaped leaves with the narrower end towards the base, and a sharply-pointed tip, white flowers and fruit that remains on the plant at maturity.

Description

Taxonomy and naming
Leptospermum thompsonii was first formally described in 1989 by Joy Thompson in the journal Telopea from specimens collected by John Boorman in 1915. The specific epithet (thompsonii) honours M.M.H. Thompson, the husband of the describing botanist, for his "assistance in the collection and field study of this and many other species".

Distribution and habitat
Monga tea-tree grows in permanently moist or wet habitats in forest and is known from populations in Monga National Park, Budawang National Park and Morton National Park.

Conservation status
This tea-tree is listed as "vulnerable" under the Australian Government Environment Protection and Biodiversity Conservation Act 1999 and the New South Wales Government Biodiversity Conservation Act 2016. The main threats to the species are altered fire regimes, forestry activities, rubbish dumping and oil spills.

References

Flora of New South Wales
thompsonii
Myrtales of Australia
Plants described in 1989
Taxa named by Joy Thompson